Captain Stephen Wentworth Roskill,  (1 August 1903 – 4 November 1982) was a senior career officer of the Royal Navy, serving during the Second World War and, after his enforced medical retirement, served as the official historian of the Royal Navy from 1949 to 1960. He is now chiefly remembered as a prodigious author of books on British maritime history.

Naval career
The son of John Henry Roskill, K.C. a barrister, and Sybil Dilke, Stephen Roskill was born in London, England and joined the Royal Navy in 1917, attending the Royal Naval College at Osborne House and then the Britannia Royal Naval College at Dartmouth, Devon.  As a midshipman Roskill served on the light cruiser  on the China Station before returning to practise gunnery at Greenwich and Portsmouth.

In 1930, he married Elizabeth Van den Bergh, with whom he had seven children. Roskill served at sea as gunnery officer of the carrier  on the China Station from 1933 to 1935.

On 13 July 1943 Leander was part of a task group of predominantly American warships off the Solomon Islands, when they engaged a force of Imperial Japanese Navy ships.  During the action, Leander was torpedoed and severely damaged.  For his actions in helping keep the ship afloat, Roskill was awarded the Distinguished Service Cross.  In March, 1944 he was promoted acting captain and sent to join the British Admiralty delegation in Washington, D.C. as chief staff officer for administration and weapons.  He was the senior British observer at the Bikini Atomic tests in 1946, and served as Deputy Director of Naval Intelligence, 1946–48 before retiring as a captain, due to increasing deafness caused by exposure to gun detonations.

Career as a naval historian
On retiring from active service in 1948, Roskill was appointed by the Cabinet Office Historical Section to write the official naval history of the Second World War.  His three-volume work The War at Sea was published between 1954 and 1961.

In 1961, Roskill was elected a senior research fellow of Churchill College, Cambridge, where he was instrumental in the foundation of the Churchill Archives Centre. The centre holds 180 boxes of Roskill's personal and research papers. After retirement, he was a visiting lecturer at several universities, including being Lees Knowles Lecturer in 1961, the distinguished visiting lecturer at the U.S. Naval Academy in 1965, and Richmond Lecturer at Cambridge University in 1967.  He was elected a vice president of the Navy Records Society in 1964 and an honorary vice president in 1974.

Honours and awards
Roskill was awarded the Distinguished Service Cross on 21 March 1944 as commander in HMNZS Leander when she was torpedoed in the Pacific.  In 1946 he was awarded the American Legion of Merit.  He was made a Commander of the Order of the British Empire in the 1971 New Year Honours and received an honorary Doctor of Literature degree from Cambridge University in 1970, from the University of Leeds in 1971, and from Oxford University in 1980.  He was elected a Fellow of The British Academy.

Dates of rank
Midshipman - 15 September 1921
Sub-lieutenant - 30 July 1924
Lieutenant - 30 August 1925
Lieutenant-commander - 30 August 1933
Commander - 31 December 1938
Captain - 30 June 1944

Published works
 Escort. The Battle of the Atlantic by Denys Arthur Rayner and edited by S. W. Roskill (1955)
 HMS Warspite. The story of a famous battleship (1957) - HMS Warspite
 The Secret Capture. (On the capture of the German submarine U-110 (1940) during the Second World War). (1959)
  The War at Sea, 1939–1945 Three volumes published from 1954–61 of the British official history series, the History of the Second World War, all edited by J. R. M. Butler
Volume 1: The Defensive (1954)
Volume 2: The Period of Balance (1956)
Volume 3: The Offensive, Part 1 (1960)
 Volume 3: The Offensive, Part 2 (1961)
 The Navy at War, 1939–1945 Published in the US as The White Ensign: The British Navy at War, 1939–1945 (1960)
 The Strategy of Sea Power. Its development and application. Based on the Lees-Knowles Lectures ... 1961 (1962)
 A Merchant Fleet in War. Alfred Holt & Co., 1939–1945. (1962)
 The Strategy of Sea Power (1962, 1984)
 The Art of Leadership (1964)
 Naval Policy Between the Wars.
Vol. 1, The period of Anglo-American antagonism, 1919–1929
Vol. 2, The period of reluctant rearmament, 1930–1939 (1968, 1976)
 Documents relating to the Royal Naval Air Service (1969)
 
 
 
 The eventful history of the mutiny and piratical seizure of HMS Bounty, its causes and consequences by Sir John Barrow - edited with an introduction by S. W. Roskill (1976)
 Churchill and the admirals (1977, 2004)
 Admiral of the Fleet Earl Beatty: The Last Naval Hero: An Intimate Biography (1980)

Notes

Citations

References

 
 

 Eugene L. Rasor, English/British Naval History since 1815. New York: Garland, 1990, pp. 38–41.

External links
 The Papers of Stephen Roskill at the Churchill Archives Centre
 Stephen Roskill: Scholar-Archivist

1903 births
1982 deaths
English naval historians
Royal Navy officers
Royal Navy officers of World War II
Recipients of the Distinguished Service Cross (United Kingdom)
Commanders of the Order of the British Empire
Commanders of the Legion of Merit
Fellows of Churchill College, Cambridge
Fellows of the British Academy
Graduates of Britannia Royal Naval College
20th-century English historians